The National Alliance for Reconstruction administration for the Cabinet of Trinidad and Tobago was assembled after the 1986 general election. The National Alliance for Reconstruction won 33 of the 36 seats.

Cabinet reshuffle: 18 December 1986 – 27 November 1987

See also
Politics of Trinidad and Tobago

References

Politics of Trinidad and Tobago
Political organisations based in Trinidad and Tobago